The Guinea leaf-toed gecko (Hemidactylus muriceus) is a species of gecko. It is found in West Africa between Guinea in the west and Nigeria east, and further east and south in Central Africa, in Cameroon, Gabon, and the Democratic Republic of the Congo. The Reptile Database also includes the Central African Republic as possible extension of its range.

References

Hemidactylus
Geckos of Africa
Reptiles of West Africa
Fauna of Benin
Reptiles of Cameroon
Vertebrates of the Central African Republic
Reptiles of the Democratic Republic of the Congo
Reptiles of Gabon
Fauna of Guinea
Fauna of Ivory Coast
Fauna of Liberia
Reptiles of Nigeria
Reptiles of the Republic of the Congo
Fauna of Togo
Reptiles described in 1870
Taxa named by Wilhelm Peters